Audley Brindley (December 31, 1923 – November 19, 1957) was an American basketball player. He played college basketball for Dartmouth College, and played professionally for the New York Knicks in the 1946–47 season for 12 games.

BAA career statistics

Regular season

Playoffs

References

 REALGM.com player
 sports-reference college stats

1923 births
1957 deaths
All-American college men's basketball players
American men's basketball players
Basketball players from New York (state)
Dartmouth Big Green men's basketball players
Forwards (basketball)
New York Knicks players
People from Mineola, New York
People from Rockville Centre, New York